Fabio Talarico (born 15 August 1968 in Argentina) is an Argentinean retired footballer.

References

Argentine footballers
Living people
Association football midfielders
1968 births
Boca Juniors footballers
Unión de Santa Fe footballers
AS Cannes players
Club Atlético River Plate footballers